A. B. Hess Cigar Factory, and Warehouses is a historic cigar factory and tobacco warehouse complex located at Lancaster, Lancaster County, Pennsylvania. The complex consist of four rectangular red brick buildings, three to five stories tall.  They are the R. H. Brubaker Tobacco Warehouse including the Koenig & Co. warehouse (c. 1880-1881), the Franklin H. Bare Tobacco Warehouse (c. 1880-1881), and the A. B. Hess Cigar Factory (c. 1905-1908).  The buildings have been converted to residential use.

It was listed on the National Register of Historic Places in 1982.  They are located in the North Shippen-Tobacco Avenue Historic District.

References

Industrial buildings and structures on the National Register of Historic Places in Pennsylvania
Commercial buildings completed in 1908
Industrial buildings completed in 1908
Buildings and structures in Lancaster, Pennsylvania
Historic district contributing properties in Pennsylvania
Historic cigar factories
Tobacco buildings in the United States
National Register of Historic Places in Lancaster, Pennsylvania
1908 establishments in Pennsylvania